Think Music Records was a Portuguese record label mainly focused on hip-hop, rap and trap music. The label was founded on 20 March 2016 by the Portuguese rapper, ProfJam.

History 
ProfJam created the label in 2016, on which he released his album Mixtakes. This was also the first big production of the label.

Thereafter, the label produced many country known singles, hitting the national tops of YouTube, Apple Music or Spotify.

"Água de Coco", of ProfJam was the most successful single of the label hitting the gold certification for sales by Associação Fonográfica Portuguesa and the top 10 of the national singles chart for a few weeks. The music video is also the one with most views on YouTube with over 12 million views.

Recently, the label partnered with the Portuguese virtual carrier, WTF, where they released the song "Só Que Sim", which also counted with the presence of many known youtubers.

Artists

Members

Discography

Albums

Singles

See also
List of record labels

External links
 YouTube
 Instagram
 Twitter
 Facebook

References

Record labels established in 2016
Portuguese record labels
Hip hop record labels